Mihkel Veske ( – ) was an Estonian poet and linguist.

Life 
Mihkel Veske was born in Veske farm, Holstre Parish (now in Metsla village, Viljandi Parish), Viljandi County in northern Livonia. He attended the village school in Pullerits, the parish school in Paistu and secondary school in Tartu. Between 1866 and 1867 he attended the mission school in Leipzig. In 1872 he graduated from the University of Leipzig with a doctoral degree. He published his doctorate in 1873 on comparative grammar of languages. Veske then returned to Estonia and worked as a journalist for the newspaper Eesti Põllumees.

From 1874 to 1887 Veske was a lecturer in Estonian language at the University of Dorpat. From 1886 until his untimely death in 1890 Veske was a lecturer in Finno-Ugric languages at the University of Kazan.

During the 1880s, Veske was one of the leading representatives of the Estonian national awakening. He belonged to the strongly patriotic groups around the Estonian intellectuals and journalists Carl Robert Jakobson. From 1882 to 1886 Veske was the President of the Society of Estonian Literati. 1884 Veske edited the magazine Oma Maa (My Land).

Veske was one of the first Estonian linguists to use the comparative method of historical linguistics. Between 1875 and 1884, he spent the summers traveling, comparing the dialects in different regions. In 1880 he visited Finland, and in 1885/86 Hungary. He advocated an Estonian standard language on the basis of the North Estonian dialect and phonetic spelling. During his time in Kazan, he studied the languages of the Mari and Mordvin, and dealt with the cultural relations between the Finnic and Slavic peoples. In 1881-83 he created a two volume textbook of the Finnish language.

After his death in Kazan, Veske's body was returned to Estonia. He is buried at the Uus-Jaani cemetery in Tartu (Dorpat). The bronze bust on his tomb was created by the Estonian sculptor August Weizenberg (now lost).

Poetry 
Veske's poetry is inspired by the simplicity of the popular Estonian folk song. Veske also collected folk poetry. He translated numerous German, Russian, Finnish and Hungarian folk songs into Estonian.

Poetry collection 
Viisidega laulud (1874)
Dr. Veske laulud (1899)
Mihkel Veske laulud (1931)

References 

1843 births
1890 deaths
People from Viljandi Parish
People from the Governorate of Livonia
Estonian male poets
19th-century Estonian poets
Academic staff of the University of Tartu
Estonian translators
Translators to Estonian
19th-century translators
19th-century poets
19th-century male writers
Leipzig University alumni
Academic staff of Kazan Federal University
Burials at Raadi cemetery